Julie Reventlow (16 February 1763 – 28 December 1816), was a Danish countess, writer and the host of a literary salon.

She was the daughter of count Heinrich Carl von Schimmelmann and Caroline von Schimmelmann, sister of Heinrich Ernst Schimmelmann, and married count Frederik Reventlow (1755–1828) in 1779. She hosted a literary salon at the estate Emkendorf in Holstein, and published works about education.

Works
 Sonntagsfreuden des Landmannes, 1791
 Kinderfreuden oder Unterricht in Gesprächen, 1793.

References

 Dansk Kvindebiografisk Leksikon

Danish countesses
1816 deaths
18th-century Danish writers
19th-century Danish writers
German salon-holders
1763 births
Julie